Luca Semproni (died 1616) was a Roman Catholic prelate who served as Bishop of Città di Castello (1610–1616).

Biography
Luca Semproni was born in Rimini, Italy.
On 26 Apr 1610, Luca Semproni was appointed during the papacy of Pope Paul V as Bishop of Città di Castello.
On 9 May 1610, he was consecrated bishop by Michelangelo Tonti, Bishop of Cesena, with Metello Bichi, Bishop Emeritus of Sovana, and Alessandro Borghi, Bishop Emeritus of Sansepolcro, serving as co-consecrators.
He served as Bishop of Città di Castello until his death on 15 Jan 1616.

While bishop, he was the principal consecrator of Domenico de' Marini, Bishop of Albenga (1611).

References

External links and additional sources
 (for Chronology of Bishops) 
 (for Chronology of Bishops) 

17th-century Italian Roman Catholic bishops
Bishops appointed by Pope Paul V
1616 deaths
People from Rimini